John A. "Peck" Morrison (September 11, 1919 – February 25, 1988) was an American jazz bassist.

Morrison was classically trained, and was competent on trumpet and percussion in addition to bass. He played in military bands in Italy during World War II and moved to New York City after the war to play professionally. He played with Lucky Thompson in the early 1950s, and then recorded with Horace Silver, Gigi Gryce, and Art Farmer. He played with Gerry Mulligan in tours of Europe. He was a noted accompanist and sideman, playing with Carmen McRae, Tiny Bradshaw, King Pleasure, Zoot Sims, Eddie Jefferson, the J. J. Johnson/Kai Winding Quintet (1954), Duke Ellington (1955 and 1964), Lou Donaldson, Johnny Smith, Mal Waldron, Randy Weston, Babs Gonzales, the Newport Rebels (1960), Shirley Scott, Red Garland, Charles McPherson, and Sy Oliver and the Harlem Blues and Jazz Band (1986).

Morrison never recorded as a session leader.

Discography
With Dave Bailey
One Foot in the Gutter (Epic, 1960)
Gettin' Into Somethin' (Epic, 1961)
With Betty Carter
Out There (Peacock, 1958)
With Lou Donaldson
Wailing With Lou (Blue Note, 1957)
Swing and Soul (Blue Note, 1957)
Blues Walk (Blue Note, 1958)
Light-Foot (Blue Note, 1959)
With Duke Ellington
All Star Road Band Volume 2 (Doctor Jazz, 1964 [1985])
Ellington '66 (Reprise, 1966)
With Red Garland
Soul Burnin' (Prestige, 1961)
Rediscovered Masters (Prestige, 1961)
The Quota (MPS, 1971 [1973])
With Willis Jackson
Really Groovin' (Prestige, 1961)
In My Solitude (Moodsville, 1961)
With Etta Jones
Love Shout (Prestige, 1963)
With Joe Jones
My Fire! (Prestige, 1969)
With Gildo Mahones
I'm Shooting High (Prestige, 1963)
With Charles McPherson
From This Moment On! (Prestige, 1968)
With Gerry Mulligan
Presenting the Gerry Mulligan Sextet (EmArcy, 1955)
With Charlie Rouse
Yeah! (Epic, 1961)
With Shirley Scott
Workin' (Prestige, 1961)
Stompin' (Prestige, 1961)
With Randy Weston
Piano á la Mode (Jubilee, 1957)
Destry Rides Again (United Artists, 1959)
Highlife (Colpix, 1963)

References
Scott Yanow, [ Peck Morrison] at Allmusic

1919 births
1988 deaths
American jazz double-bassists
Male double-bassists
20th-century American musicians
20th-century double-bassists
20th-century American male musicians
American male jazz musicians
Harlem Blues and Jazz Band members
American military personnel of World War II